Nathan is the second studio album by Australian blues rock musician Nathan Cavaleri, credited to Nathan Cavaleri Band. The album was released in October 1994, peaked at number 71 on the ARIA Albums Chart.

The album features vocals from American R&B singer Sweet Pea Atkinson and Irish pop-rock singer Andrew Strong.

Reception

Erik Crawford from AllMusic said "Drawing inspiration from the likes of Stevie Ray Vaughan, Mark Knopfler and Robben Ford, Cavaleri demonstrates that he has learned well from the masters. It's difficult to believe that someone so young could play with such soul and bravado, but he delivers jaw-dropping solos on track after track."

Track listing

Charts

Release history

References

1994 albums
Nathan Cavaleri albums
Mushroom Records albums